Hamilton John McNeill (13 May 1910 – 2002), more commonly known as John McNeill, was a Maltese footballer who played for Hull City and Bury in the Football League.

References

1910 births
2002 deaths
Maltese footballers
Association football forwards
Leicester City F.C. players
Ayr United F.C. players
Hull City A.F.C. players
Bury F.C. players
English Football League players
Parkhead F.C. players
Dunipace F.C. players